SS Patrick H. Morrissey was a Liberty ship built in the United States during World War II. She was originally named after Patrick H. Morrissey, a former head of the Brotherhood of Railway Trainmen. She was transferred to the British Ministry of War Transportation (MoWT) and renamed Samdee upon completion.

Construction
Patrick H. Morrissey was laid down on 23 October 1943, under a Maritime Commission (MARCOM) contract, MC hull 1507, by J.A. Jones Construction, Brunswick, Georgia; she was sponsored by Katherine M. Geraghty, daughter of Patrick H. Morrissey, and launched on 9 December 1943.

History
She was allocated to Thos. & Jno. Brocklebank, Ltd., on 17 December 1943. On or about 18 April 1947, she was sold to Thos. & Jno. Brocklebank, Ltd. Samdee was scrapped in 1967.

References

Bibliography

 
 
 
 
 
 

 

Liberty ships
Ships built in Brunswick, Georgia
1943 ships
Liberty ships transferred to the British Ministry of War Transport